Findlay Creek is a suburban neighbourhood in Gloucester-South Nepean Ward in the south end of Ottawa, Ontario, Canada. According to the 2021 Canadian Census, the population of the community was 14,089 and there were 4,395 dwellings.

The Findlay Creek Community Association is the volunteer group representing the interests of the community.

Findlay Creek also has a small shopping centre and 3 gas stations.

History 
In May 1988, the Regional Municipality of Ottawa-Carleton began rezoning this future urban area. Official plans were released in May 1989 with the Leitrim Official Plan Amendment No. 10. This initial plan was met with push-back from groups such as the Ottawa Field Naturalists Club due to the sensitive nature of the wetland system this subdivision would partially destroy, however plans ultimately went forward.

Prior to the establishment of the Findlay Creek community, the area was a primarily undeveloped and used for a mix of residential, industrial, and institutional needs. In November 2003, the Leitrim Community Design Plan (CDP) was initiated to develop the community with a mix of land uses and housing types.

A plan to widen Bank Street along Findlay Creek was announced in 2020, slated to begin in 2022.

Geography 
Findlay Creek is located just south-west of the intersection of Leitrim Road and Bank Street, and stretches west to Albion Road. The eponymous Findlay Creek springs in the Leitrim Wetlands, directly south of the neighbourhood, and is a tributary of the North Castor River.

Transport 

As of fall 2021, two regular OC Transpo routes serve Findlay Creek: the local route 93 and the connexion route 294. In addition, the school route 699 serving École secondaire publique Pierre-De-Blois in Barrhaven passes through the neighbourhood.

Schools 

 Vimy Ridge Public School (opened in September 2017) is a public elementary school for Junior Kindergarten (JK) to Grade 8. It's located at the intersection of Kelly Farm Drive and Findlay Creek Drive.

References

External links
Findlay Creek Community Association

Neighbourhoods in Ottawa